Zethus may refer to:

Zethus, the husband of the nymph Thebe in Greek mythology
Zethus (wasp), a genus of potter wasps
Zethus (crater), a crater on Jupiter's moon Thebe